KDNN (98.5 FM, "Island 98.5") is a Hawaiian Contemporary hits formatted radio station based in Honolulu, Hawaii. The iHeartMedia, Inc. outlet broadcasts with an ERP of 51 kW. It also transmits on Oceanic Spectrum digital channel 851 for the entire state of Hawaii.  Its studios are located in the Kalihi neighborhood of Honolulu, while its transmitter is located downtown.

History
98.5 signed on the air in 1988 as KHHH, "The Wave," boasting a new age (or "smooth jazz") format. Soon after, the station picked up the satellite format "Z-Rock," and for a time boasted that adrenaline-pumping, testosterone fueled format. When that didn't work, KHHH began simulcasting its all-news AM sibling KHVH. Soon after, the station flipped again, as KKLV with a Classic Hits format (which was launched in 1994), but by 1999 they would flip to the "Island Rhythm" format, which targeted young adults with a mix of Contemporary Hawaiian hits, Reggae and local fare. Launched as Island Rhythm 98-5, Mornings were anchored by Lanai & Augie, and popular disc jockeys Rodney Villanuewa, Wendy From Waianae, Eddie L, Jake, Pomai, John James, Makani, Big Steve and K Kamani made KDNN, Honolulu's most listened to station.  Around 2005, the station name was shortened from Island Rhythm 98.5 to simply Island 98.5.

KDNN is one of Honolulu's FM stations whose format is geared toward native Hawaiians. The stations KQMQ, KCCN, and KINE also target local Hawaiians.

In May 2009, after a very successful 19 year run at Rhythmic CHR KIKI-FM, Rory Wild & The Wake Up Crew moved to KDNN-FM bringing along popular features Wild Wahine Wednesday, Psychic Thursday, and Stupid Joke Friday. Island 98.5 immediately exploded in the ratings overtaking longtime rival KCCN-FM and closing in on sister station KSSK-FM for the highest ratings in Honolulu. At around the same time, the iHeartRadio app took off, and Island 98.5 became available worldwide. 

In 2018, KDNN-FM started the Island Music Awards in order to honor the popular recording artists on their playlist

KDNN-HD2
KDNN previously offered Country Music on its HD-2 side channel. As of 2012, it offers Traditional Hawaiian Music branded as "Hawai’i No Ka’Oi" (translated as "Indeed the Best"). Previously, "Hawai’i No Ka’Oi" simulcasted on a translator with callsign K256AS on 99.1.

References

External links
 KDNN official website
 

DNN
Hawaiian-music formatted radio stations
Radio stations established in 1988
Contemporary hit radio stations in the United States
IHeartMedia radio stations
1988 establishments in Hawaii